Olof Sandborg (April 30, 1884 in Göteborg – March 26, 1965 in Stockholm) was a Swedish stage and film actor.  He won the Eugene O'Neill Award in 1962.

Filmography
 Blodets röst (1913)
 Lady Marions sommarflirt (1913)
 Svärmor på vift eller Förbjudna vägar (1916)
 Brottmålsdomaren (1917)
The Doctor's Secret (1930)
 International Match (1932)
 Djurgårdsnätter (1933)
 En melodi om våren (1933)
Man's Way with Women (1934)
 A Wedding Night at Stjarnehov (1934)
 Andersson's Kalle (1934)
 The Ghost of Bragehus (1936)
 Happy Vestköping (1937)
 Russian Flu (1937)
 Career (1938)
 Only One Night (1939)
 Mot nya tider (1939)
 Hans Nåds testamente (1940)
 The Talk of the Town (1941)
 General von Döbeln (1942)
 Adventurer (1942)
  The Emperor of Portugallia  (1944)
 Tired Theodore (1945)
 Simon the Sinner (1954)
 Whoops! (1955)
The Dance Hall (1955)
 Moon Over Hellesta (1956)
 Night Child (1956)
 The Halo Is Slipping (1957)
 A Dreamer's Journey (1957)
 Miss April (1958)
 On a Bench in a Park (1960)
 Adventures of Nils Holgersson (1962)
 Mysteriet natten till den 25:e (1975)

References

People from Gothenburg
1884 births
1965 deaths
Swedish male stage actors
Swedish male film actors
Swedish male silent film actors
20th-century Swedish male actors
Eugene O'Neill Award winners